Charles Templeton (1915–2001) was a Canadian author, politician, inventor and evangelist.

Charles Templeton may also refer to:

 Charles Templeton (cricketer) (1806–1834), English cricketer
 Charles A. Templeton (1871–1955), American politician and Governor of Connecticut
 Charles F. Templeton (1856–1913), Justice of the Dakota Territorial Supreme Court
 Chuck Templeton (baseball) (1932–1997), pitcher in Major League Baseball
 Chuck Templeton (born 1968), American Internet entrepreneur

See also
Templeton (disambiguation)